Opisthorchis is a genus of flukes in the family Opisthorchiidae.

Species

Species in the genus Opisthorchis include:
 Opisthorchis chabaudi Bourgat & Kulo, 1977 
 Opisthorchis felineus (Rivolta, 1884) 
 Opisthorchis gomtii Mehra, 1941 
 Opisthorchis parasiluri Long & Lee 
 Opisthorchis viverrini Poirier, 1886

The species known as Clonorchis sinensis has sometimes been reclassified into the genus Opisthorchis.

Etymology  
From the Greek opisthen (behind) and orchis (testicle), Opisthorchis is a genus of trematode flatworms whose testes are located in the posterior end of the body. Sebastiano Rivolta is generally credited with discovering the first opisthorchid, which he named Distoma felineus, in a cat in Italy in 1884. However, the fluke may have been mentioned by Karl Rudolphi in 1819, and in 1831, Gurlt published a textbook that included a drawing of a fluke that was almost certainly Opisthorchis. By the end of the 19th century, Distoma contained so many species that Raphaël Blanchard introduced the genus Opisthorchis for elongated flat flukes with testes in the posterior end of the body. He chose Rivolta's Opisthorchis felineus as the type species.

See also
 List of parasites (human)

References
Includes public domain text from the CDC as cited

External links 
 

Digenea genera